Dragons RFC are one of the four professional rugby union regional teams in Wales. They are owned by the Welsh Rugby Union and play their home games at Rodney Parade, Newport and at other grounds around the region. They play in the United Rugby Championship and the European Rugby Champions Cup/European Rugby Challenge Cup. The region they represent covers an area of southeast Wales including Blaenau Gwent, Caerphilly, Monmouthshire, Newport and Torfaen with a total population approaching 600,000 and they are affiliated with a number of semi-professional and amateur clubs throughout the area, including Pontypool RFC, Caerphilly RFC, Cross Keys RFC, Ebbw Vale RFC and Newport RFC.

Formed in 2003 as a result of the introduction of regional rugby union teams in Wales, the team started life with a third-place finish in the 2003–04 Celtic League, and finished fourth the next season; however, the team finished in the bottom three in each of the next four seasons. In 2007, they reached the semi-finals of the European Challenge Cup, losing to French side ASM Clermont Auvergne 46–29. In 2011, they reached the semi-finals of the Anglo-Welsh Cup, losing to Gloucester. They are yet to make the knock-out stage of the European Rugby Champions Cup.

History

Formation

The regional team were formed on 1 April 2003, following an agreement between Ebbw Vale RFC and Newport RFC to form one of five regional rugby entities. Fundamental disagreements between the clubs saw a period of arbitration, led by the then Welsh Rugby Union chief executive David Moffett, which recommended the name "Gwent Dragons". On 28 July the side was launched under that name. This prompted Newport RFC benefactor Tony Brown of Bisley, Surrey to withdraw his financial support for the region. However, by 21 August Brown returned after Ebbw Vale chairman Marcus Russell resigned and the side's name was changed to "Newport and Gwent Dragons". With the Welsh Rugby Union demanding an explanation for the changes, and acrimony between the two clubs another agreement was struck: the side officially became  'Newport Gwent Dragons'. On 12 November 2003, the region's founding company Gwent Rugby Ltd entered into
administration. On 27 November a new company, Dragons Rugby Ltd., was established to run the region, with Newport RFC and the Welsh Rugby Union each holding a 50% stake.

2003–2005: Infancy

Under Mike Ruddock and his assistant Clive Griffiths Newport Gwent Dragons, with a squad largely drawn from the Newport RFC and Ebbw Vale RFC sides of the preceding year, beat their limited pre-season expectations. Despite starting their life in top-class rugby with a 35–11 defeat away to Llanelli Scarlets, it was the region's most successful season so far. A 29–19 win over the Ospreys was to prove more telling; captained by Andy Marinos the side remained unbeaten at home in the Celtic League and eliminated Stade Français in the Heineken Cup. Going into the final round with an outside chance of taking the title, the Dragons finished third in the Celtic League WRU bosses were impressed enough to appoint Ruddock to the vacant Welsh coaching job in summer 2004. In 2005, Ruddock guided Wales to a Grand Slam Title in the Six Nations. Ruddock rewarded two of his former Dragons players, Hal Luscombe and Jason Forster, with their first test caps on Wales' summer tour of Argentina. Wales  Percy Montgomery also impressed Springbok selectors enough to remind them of his international credentials, and earn a Tri Nations recall.

The following off season saw a marked change in direction. Gareth Cooper, Kevin Morgan and Ceri Sweeney were amongst a handful of players who joined the region when the Celtic Warriors were disbanded. Having originally agreed to replace Mike Ruddock as head coach, Declan Kidney decided instead to seek employment back home with Leinster. It was not until 27 July 2004 that former Australia national rugby league team coach Chris Anderson was appointed, with Leigh Jones as his assistant. Another credible Celtic League campaign followed, finishing fourth, the second highest Welsh region. The side's Heineken Cup could be viewed as a wasted opportunity: the team beat French side Perpignan 27–14 at home, but were then beaten home and away by Newcastle Falcons to put paid to any quarter-final ambitions. Chris Anderson's contract was not extended beyond its initial one-year duration.

2005–2011 Paul Turner era 

The region looked to Harlequins backs coach Paul Turner, a Welshman, as their new head coach. Turner would also have to contend with Percy Montgomery returning to South Africa and Newport RFC stalwart Rod Snow retiring. Munster and Sale Sharks proved too strong in the 2005–06 Heineken Cup. After finishing 8th in the Celtic League, a 24–15 defeat Overmach Parma in a play-off for a place in the following seasons Heineken cup proved a new low for the region. Anglo-Welsh Cup wins over Leicester Tigers and Northampton Saints were the highlights of a tough season. Turner remained, but Wales international Hal Luscombe opted for a move away from the region, joining English Premiership side Harlequins.

Former Wales captain Colin Charvis joined ahead of the 2006–07 season with the Dragons progressed into a European Challenge Cup semi-final, where they lost comfortably to ASM Clermont Auvergne. Domestically though, the region's European exploits appeared to take their toll, finishing ninth in the Celtic League. Significantly the region avoided the prospect of a second season away from the Heineken Cup, defeating another Italian side Calvisano 22–15. The match also marked the end for departing Wales internationals Ian Gough and Gareth Cooper at Rodney Parade.

2007–08 proved to be another difficult season for the region. Signings such as scrum-half Andy Williams and flanker Richard Parks were not able to help reverse the side's fortunes. The Dragons 2007–08 Heineken Cup campaign only saw one win against Italian side Treviso and exiting the Anglo-Welsh Cup in the pool stages for a third year running. Between completing a double over Llanelli Scarlets on 1 January to defeating the Ospreys on 6 May, the Dragons failed to win a Celtic League game. Despite finishing as the lowest-placed Welsh side in the league the region qualified for next season's Heineken Cup, without having to play off against Italian opposition due to a failure by the Italian League to finish before a specified date.

The summer of 2008 marked a change in the Dragons recruitment policy to a more antipodean focus. Several new signings included New Zealander Tom Willis who was also appointed captain. The 2008–09 Heineken Cup saw visible signs of encouragement for the region. An opening round defeat of Glasgow at Rodney Parade and two respectable defeats to French giants Toulouse, sandwiched between narrow losses against Bath offered hope of arresting decline at Rodney Parade. Domestically in the Celtic League it was a case of same old as consecutive defeats in rearranged matches away at Cardiff Blues and the Ospreys ended any hopes of avoiding finishing as the lowest placed Welsh region and another Heineken Cup play off against Italian opposition. In record appearance holder Adam Black's final game for the side, the Dragons ran out comfortable winners away to Calvisano to secure their place in European rugby's premier tournament for a third season running.

The 2009–10 season brought about significant improvements in results, with the Dragons remaining unbeaten at Rodney Parade in the Celtic League until their final home match, a 20–14 loss to Cardiff Blues. Defeat also brought about the end of the Dragons bid to qualify for the inaugural Celtic League playoffs. An improved seventh-place finish did, however, mean automatic qualification for the Heineken cup as the third highest finishing Welsh region. Despite coming close to defeating Gloucester away at Kingsholm and a win at home against Glasgow, back to back losses at Biarritz put paid to the Dragons chances of progressing past the group stages of the Heineken Cup for the first time.

2011–2017
Turner stepped down as head coach in February 2011 with Darren Edwards taking over in a caretaker capacity. In March 2011 Edwards led the Dragons to their first Anglo-Welsh Cup semi-final, where they lost to Gloucester. In April 2011 Edwards was appointed Head Coach on a full-time basis. Lyn Jones was appointed to the role of Director of Rugby in 2013 taking over a lot of on field responsibilities. He brought with him then Russia head coach Kingsley Jones who worked with him as a consultant at London Welsh. Edwards left the Dragons in February 2014 while in June, Jones was promoted to the role of head coach.

During the 2014–2015 season, the Dragons reached the semi-finals of the Challenge Cup, having defeated the Cardiff Blues 25-21. This was their second time reaching the semi-finals, having done so in 2007. They lost 45-16 to Edinburgh in the semi-final. 

The following season, the Dragons once again reached the semi-finals of the Challenge Cup, but lost 22-12 to Montpellier.

2017–Present: WRU Ownership

In March 2017, following a vote of Newport RFC shareholders, the Welsh Rugby Union agreed to take over the Newport Gwent Dragons in its entirety as part of a deal that also saw the WRU take ownership of the Rodney Parade ground. Following the takeover, Bernard Jackman was appointed head coach, and on 20 June 2017 it was announced that following the takeover of the region by the WRU, the region would be dropping "Newport Gwent" from its name with immediate effect, becoming known simply as "Dragons". Jackman's endured a difficult first season in charge in 2017-18, with the Dragons recording only two wins in the league. Despite recruiting heavily for the 2018-19 campaign, including Wales forwards Ross Moriarty and Richard Hibbard, results did not improve and Jackman was dismissed in 2019 to be replaced by Dean Ryan.

During the WRU-ownership period, the Dragons signed a large number of English-born players eligible for Wales thanks to parents or grandparents, such as Ross Moriarty, Will Talbot-Davies, Tom Griffiths, Huw Taylor, Nick Tompkins, Joe Maksymiw, Greg Bateman and Will Rowlands.

Ahead of the 2022–2023 season, the Dragons continued their extensive recruitment drive, including established props Rhodri Jones and Rob Evans, as well as locks Sean Lonsdale and George Nott from the Premiership. JJ Hanrahan joined from Clermont, while two centres; Welsh-qualified Max Clark and New Zealander Sio Tomkinson added further depth. Further signings were made in the lead up to season.

Team name
The naming of the region's team caused considerable turbulence. Newport Gwent Dragons were a new side created out of the restructuring of Welsh rugby, and represent their designated region, like the Cardiff Blues, the Scarlets and the Ospreys. Some in the Welsh rugby world, such as Bobby Windsor, believed that including the name Newport would alienate some fans in the surrounding valleys. Many supporters in the wider Newport area favoured greater identification with the City of Newport and a continuation of the historic traditions of Newport RFC. Several names were suggested but all were rejected by the WRU. In the end, the WRU decided the region would be called the Gwent Dragons. However, initial response to the new region was mixed, with many fans unsure whether to buy a season ticket for the new side or to stick to their local clubs. The company set up to run the side entered administration before a game had been played, and as a compromise the word "Newport" was added to the team name in a double-sized font, whilst "Gwent" was reduced. This addition and choice of kit added a greater Newport emphasis to the region and polarised the regions' fan base: some supporters of Ebbw Vale, Pontypool, Cross Keys and Newbridge turned their backs on the regional side, claiming that Gwent was no longer being equally represented. This debate continued, with the Dragons being accused of favouritism towards their Newport feeder club rather than the other feeder clubs.

The Newport Action Group, among others, claimed the side has lost more supporters by including the name "Gwent" in its title. The crowds supporting Newport Gwent Dragons averaged 5,154 for the 2005–06 season, whereas in the 2002–03 season, Newport RFC was Wales' best supported club and British rugby's fourth best with an average attendance of 8,302 – behind English Premiership clubs Leicester, Gloucester and Northampton. In the 2006–07 season, attendance averaged 5,629 at Rodney Parade.

On the 27 June 2022, the Dragons announced their rebranding as Dragons RFC. The new playing colours being black and amber to represent the traditional colours of Newport sporting teams and the blue of the historic Monmouthshire county. The new badge includes three fleur-de-lis derived from the county Flag of Monmouthshire.

Kit
The Dragons kit for the 2022-2023 season is supplied by VX3. Their current 'Headline Sponsor' is Compeed.

Home ground
The region's ground is the 8,700 capacity Rodney Parade ground in Newport, where they play the majority of their home games. Games are occasionally hosted at other grounds in Gwent, such as Pontypool Park or Pandy Park (home of Cross Keys RFC). These are usually pre-season or other fixtures, however occasionally league games are taken elsewhere such as in 2017 when a game against local rivals Cardiff Blues was hosted at the Constructaquote Stadium (formerly Virginia Park), home of Caerphilly RFC, due to a fixture clash with Newport County AFC; and during the 2017/18 season when the Dragons hosted a Pro14 game against Edinburgh Rugby in Eugene Cross Park, Ebbw Vale.

As a part of Judgement Day, each season a home game against a rival Welsh rugby region is hosted at the Millennium Stadium in Cardiff.

In preparation for the 2014–15 season the Newport Gwent Dragons agreed a partnership with Caerphilly County Borough Council for the team and coaching staff to use the CCB Centre for Sporting Excellence as the new training base for the 1st team and all other age grade structures within the region. The small stadium at the centre hosts the home matches of the Dragons U23 side, which competes in the Celtic Cup.

Current United Rugby Championship table

Current squad

Senior academy

Notable players

Michael Owen captained Wales in 2005–06 and he led Wales to their first Grand Slam for 27-years in the 2005 Six Nations Championship.

Lewis Evans has made over 200 appearances for the Dragons. Adam Black, Jamie Ringer, Peter Sidoli, Gareth Wyatt, Steve Jones, Luke Charteris, Wayne Evans, Aled Brew, Ashley Smith, Adam Jones, Hugh Gustafson, Jason Tovey, Robert Sidoli, Phil Price, Adam Hughes, Nic Cudd, Rynard Landman, Matthew Screech and Brok Harris have made over one hundred Dragons appearances. Prop Adam Black became the first centurion in Dragons colours during the 2006–07 season.

Several former players have been capped by the Wales national rugby union team while with the region; props Chris Anthony and Rhys M. Thomas, hookers Steve Jones and Lloyd Burns, second rows Ian Gough, Luke Charteris, Andrew Coombs and Cory Hill, flankers Jason Forster, Richard Parks, Jamie Ringer, Gavin Thomas and Dan Lydiate, number eight Michael Owen, Rhys Oakley and Taulupe Faletau, scrum halves Gareth Cooper and Andy Williams, outside half Ceri Sweeney, centres Andy Marinos, Tyler Morgan and Nick Tompkins, wingers Gareth Wyatt, Hal Luscombe, Aled Brew, Will Harries, Tom Prydie, Hallam Amos, Jonah Holmes and fullback Kevin Morgan. Percy Montgomery, Sione Tu'ipulotu, Rod Snow, Mike Hercus, Mike Petri, James Arlidge, Will Kelly and Mesake Doge played internationally for their respective countries whilst with the region.

Of the current players Ollie Griffiths, Leon Brown, Elliot Dee, Aaron Wainwright, Ross Moriarty, Ben Carter, Taine Basham, Will Rowlands, Rio Dyer and Bradley Roberts have featured in Wales test matches whilst with the region, as have Gonzalo Bertranou and Aki Seiuli for Argentina and Samoa respectively. Rhodri Williams, Rob Evans, Rhodri Jones, and Sam Davies achieved Wales international caps before joining the Dragons.

British & Irish Lions
The following players have been selected to play for the British & Irish Lions touring squads while playing for the Dragons.

Coaching staff

Former coaches

Results and statistics

Celtic League / Pro12 / Pro14 / United Rugby Championship

Celtic Cup

Heineken Cup / European Rugby Champions Cup

European Challenge Cup / European Rugby Challenge Cup

Anglo-Welsh Cup

Honours
 Glasgow City Sevens
 Champions (1): 2008

References

External links
 
 Bedwas RFC website
 Cross Keys RFC website
 Ebbw Vale RFC website
 Newport RFC website
 Pontypool RFC website

 
Welsh rugby union teams
Rugby clubs established in 2003
United Rugby Championship teams
Organisations based in Newport, Wales